Before the Kommunalreformen ("The Municipality Reform" of 2007), Aalestrup municipality was a municipality (Danish, kommune) in Viborg County on the Jutland peninsula in northern Denmark. The municipality covered an area of 176 km2, and had a total population of 7,631 (2005).  Its latest mayor was Rigmor Sandborg.

The main town and the site of its municipal council was the town of Aalestrup. The municipality was located on the eastern shores of the area known as Himmerland, a part of the Jutland peninsula; the western border of the municipality was partially defined by the waters of Lovn's Broadening (Lovns Bredning).

On 1 January 2007 Aalestrup municipality ceased and was merged with the former Farsø, Løgstør, and Aars municipalities to form the new Vesthimmerland Municipality. This created a municipality with an area of 815 km2 and a total population of 39,176 (2005).  The new municipality belongs to the Region Nordjylland ("North Jutland Region").

Shield
The upper part has two heads on a white background, the middle has a red band with a fish on it, and the bottom is white with one head.

References  
 Municipal statistics: NetBorger Kommunefakta, delivered from KMD aka Kommunedata (Municipal Data)
 Municipal mergers and neighbors: Eniro new municipalities map

External links 
  

Former municipalities of Denmark